Harrell Judson Woolard (born October 6, 1963) is a swimmer who represented the United States Virgin Islands. He competed in four events at the 1984 Summer Olympics.

References

External links

1963 births
Living people
United States Virgin Islands male swimmers
Olympic swimmers of the United States Virgin Islands
Swimmers at the 1984 Summer Olympics
Swimmers at the 1979 Pan American Games
Pan American Games competitors for the United States Virgin Islands
Place of birth missing (living people)